Besa is a Serbian-British television series produced by Adrenalin and Red Planet Pictures.

Synopsis
Inspired by a true story and from an original idea by Srđan Šaper, the plot follows Uroš, a family man and a businessman from Belgrade who kills the daughter of Dardan, an Albanian drug lord, in a road accident. To atone for her death and in order to protect the lives of his own family, he is forced to start working as a hitman for the Albanian mob.

Besa is an Albanian cultural precept, usually translated as "faith" or "oath", that means "to keep the promise" and "word of honor".

Production
Besa brought together writer/producer Tony Jordan and several Serbian screenwriters and script doctors, as well as international and regional actors, in creating the first TV series in the Adriatic region that compares with the standards of British television drama.

Besa features a mixture of local and international talent, with Taken costars Radivoje Bukvić and Arben Bajraktaraj playing the leads. Director Dušan Lazarević previous credits include Misfits, Vera, Death In Paradise, Silent Witness. The series gathered more than 200 actors from the entire territory of the former Yugoslavia, as well as foreign actors from Albania, United Kingdom and France.

Besa was set up as an international co-production between Adrenalin and Red Planet Pictures. It was filmed for 120 days on numerous attractive locations throughout the Balkans. International sales and Distribution is handled by MBC Studios.

The second season was shot from 2020 to 2021 in Montenegro, Serbia and Estonia.

Awards
At FEDIS, the 9th International festival of domestic television series, Besa won the Golden Antenna award for Best TV series produced in Serbia, as well as for Best Music by composer Nemanja Mosurović and Best Photography by the director of photography Igor Šunter.

Cast and Characters

References

External links 
 

Serbian television series
Television shows set in Serbia
Television shows filmed in Serbia
Television shows filmed in Montenegro
Television shows filmed in Estonia